Lithuanian Space Science and Technology Institute is private research organization established by the Lithuanian Space Association in 2010, based in Vilnius, Lithuania.

In 2013 LSSTI was one of the creators of one of the first two scientific nano-satellites in Lithuania, which were intended both for scientific tasks, technologies demonstrations, educational purposes and popularization of science. The satellite was successfully launched in 2014.

LSSTI is a member of Neva Consortium.

See also 
Lithuanian Space Association
NanoAvionics

References 

2010 establishments in Lithuania
Organizations based in Vilnius
Research institutes in Lithuania
Space program of Lithuania